Bosnia and Herzegovina has participated in the World Championships in Athletics since the early 1990s; after Bosnia and Herzegovina independence from the Socialist Federal Republic of Yugoslavia. Kada Delić was the first Bosnian athlete to appear at the World Championships in Athletics.

Their first ever medal was Bronze and was won by Amel Tuka in 2015 Beijing; in the Men's 800 metres discipline.

Medalists

By event

By gender

Competitors by event
The following is a list of the total number of competitors by event in the World Championships.

See also
 Bosnian and Herzegovinian records in athletics
 Bosnia and Herzegovina at the Olympics
 Bosnia and Herzegovina at the Paralympics

External links
 ASBIH web site
 Bosnian and Herzegovinian Outdoor Records - Men
 Bosnian and Herzegovinian Outdoor Records - Women

Nations at the World Athletics Championships
 
Athletics in Bosnia and Herzegovina